Alipes is a genus of bark centipedes in the family Scolopendridae, found in Africa.

Species
These seven species belong to the genus Alipes:
 Alipes appendiculatus Pocock, 1896  (Africa, Malawi, and Mozambique)
 Alipes calcipes Cook, 1897  (Africa, Angola, and Zimbabwe)
 Alipes crotalus (Gerstaecker, 1854)  (Africa, Mozambique, South Africa, and Uganda)
 Alipes grandidieri Lucas, 1864  (Africa, Kenya, Tanzania, and Uganda)
 Alipes madecassus Saussure & Zehntner, 1902  (Africa)
 Alipes madegassus Saussure & Zehntner, 1902  (Madagascar)
 Alipes multicostis Imhoff, 1854  (Africa, Cameroon, the Democratic Republic of the Congo, Ghana, Rwanda, and Sierra Leone)

References

Scolopendridae